State Highway 52 (SH-52) is a  state highway in the U.S. state of Idaho that travels along the Payette River from the Oregon State Line and Snake River to Horseshoe Bend.

Route description
State Highway 52 begins at the Oregon/Idaho state line at the terminus of Oregon Route 52 where the highway crosses the Snake River near Payette. The highway heads eastward through the city of Payette, then following the Payette River. The highway meets SH-72 at its junction east of New Plymouth. Then heads eastward to the city of Emmett where it turns north at its junction with SH-16 then continuing east up Black Canyon to its terminus at Horseshoe Bend.

History
This route has been in existence since 1929, originally as part of State Highway 16, which originally terminated in Horseshoe Bend. State Highway 52 was created in 1938, when the northern section of SH-16 from Emmett to Horseshoe Bend was rerouted westward to New Plymouth. SH-16 was eventually truncated at Emmett in 1955, and SH-52 was then extended westward along the former SH-16 heading toward New Plymouth, and ending up in Payette and the state line.

Major intersections

See also
 List of highways numbered 52

References

External link

052
Transportation in Payette County, Idaho
Transportation in Gem County, Idaho
Transportation in Boise County, Idaho